Thomas Alexander Bailey (born 18 January 1956) is an English singer, songwriter, musician, composer and record producer. Bailey came to prominence in the early 1980s as the lead vocalist for the new wave band Thompson Twins, which released five singles that entered the top ten charts in the United Kingdom during the 1980s: "Love On Your Side", "We Are Detective", "Hold Me Now", "Doctor! Doctor!", and "You Take Me Up". He was the only member of the band to have formal musical training. From 1994, Bailey was also a member of its later incarnation, Babble, releasing two commercially unsuccessful studio albums. He released his debut solo studio album Science Fiction in 2018.

He currently works in various musical fields including scoring for film. He records and performs dub music under the name International Observer and Indo-fusion music with the Holiwater Project. He also collaborated with astronomer and visual artist José Francisco Salgado as part of the audio-visual ensemble Bailey-Salgado Project (BSP).

Early life and education
Tom Bailey grew up in a family associated with the medical profession. His father was the Medical Officer of Health for Chesterfield Borough Council, and Bailey was educated at Chesterfield Grammar School. After training as a classical pianist, Bailey initially worked as a music teacher at Brook School, Sheffield. In his late teens and early twenties, he travelled the world.

Musical career

1977–1993: Thompson Twins

Bailey formed Thompson Twins in 1977 with Pete Dodd (guitar and vocals), John Roog (guitar), and Jon Podgorski (drums). Podgorski did not want to move to London, so Andrew Edge played drums with them for one year before Chris Bell joined. The group eventually ended up as a trio with Bailey on lead vocals, guitar, bass, and keyboards, his then girlfriend Alannah Currie (percussion, saxophone, and backing vocals), and Joe Leeway (percussion and vocals). Thompson Twins became fixtures on MTV during the 1980s as the videos for "Hold Me Now", "Lay Your Hands on Me" and "King for a Day" were played frequently. Subsequent to the marriage of Bailey and Currie, Thompson Twins released their final studio album, Queer, in 1991.

1993–1996: Babble

In 1994, Bailey and Currie formed the electronica-orientated duo, Babble.

2000s: International Observer

Between 2001 and 2015, Bailey released several dub and electronica albums under the name International Observer.

2010s: Tom Bailey solo
Bailey performed Thompson Twins songs live for the first time in 27 years on 17 August 2014 at Temple Island Meadows, Henley-on-Thames, Oxfordshire for the Rewind Festival.

Also in 2014, Bailey took part in the Retro Futura Tour in the US. He was billed under the moniker "Thompson Twins' Tom Bailey." The 2014 Retro Futura Tour also featured Howard Jones, Midge Ure, China Crisis, and Katrina Leskanich of Katrina and the Waves. During an interview with the Stuck in the '80s podcast prior to the tour, Bailey said that while preparing for his return to the stage he went to a store and bought a Thompson Twins greatest-hits CD to help him learn the songs again.

In 2016, Bailey released a new solo single titled "Come So Far", which included a music video.

On 25 April 2017 the official Thompson Twins' Tom Bailey website announced that Bailey was recording his debut solo studio album and that he hoped to release the album in early 2018. The album, titled Science Fiction, was released in July 2018. To promote the album, Bailey toured the United States and United Kingdom with the B-52's, Culture Club, and Belinda Carlisle as part of The Life Tour.

2020s: Into the Gap Australian Tour

In October 2022, Bailey performed the Thompson Twins' studio album Into the Gap in its entirety in Australia, (along with his band known as "The Sisters of Mercy"), having recently moved back to New Zealand full time from his home in London.

Musical collaborations
In 1983, Bailey played keyboards and percussion on Paul Haig's debut studio album Rhythm of Life.

In 1988 Bailey collaborated with Phil Thornalley, who worked frequently with Thompson Twins, on Thornalley's only solo studio album, Swamp. Aside from playing instruments, Bailey also produced three tracks, remixed three tracks along with Thornalley and co-wrote the track "When I Get to Heaven".

In 1999 Bailey produced the New Zealand band Stellar, and in 1999 he won Record Producer of the Year in New Zealand for their debut studio album, Mix.

In 2002 Bailey became the figurehead for the dub project International Observer. Recent performances with 'Holiwater', a cinematic fusion of Indian classical music (Sarod- Vikash Maharaj), electronica (keyboards – Bailey) and video (film maker – Andrei Jewell), blur boundaries between art installation and performance. The band was formed to highlight issues of water pollution on the Ganges.

In 2010 Bailey and astronomer and visual artist José Francisco Salgado formed an audiovisual ensemble called Bailey-Salgado Project (BSP). BSP combines music with photography, video, and motion graphics to create multimedia works that have as subject the physical world. Their first work together, a short film entitled Sidereal Motion, was previewed in Bath, England in October 2010.

Personal life
Bailey was married to Thompson Twins member Alannah Currie from 1991 to 2003. They have two children. As of 2014, Bailey lives in France with his second wife, artist Lauren Drescher. He has homes in New Zealand, France, and London. Bailey has been vocal about his choice to be a vegan, and he does not drink or use recreational drugs.

Discography
Solo
Science Fiction (2018), UK#166 SCO#68

with Thompson Twins
A Product Of... (Participation) (1981)
Set (1982)
Quick Step and Side Kick (1983)
Into the Gap (1984)
Here's to Future Days (1985)
Close to the Bone (1987)
Big Trash (1989)
Queer (1991)

with Babble
The Stone (1994)
Ether (1996)

Gallery

See also
List of vegans

References

External links
 Holiwater official site
 Bailey-Salgado Project (BSP) official site
 Tom Bailey interview with Stuck in the '80s podcast
 
 
 

1956 births
British synth-pop new wave musicians
English pop singers
English new wave musicians
English record producers
English rock bass guitarists
Male bass guitarists
English rock singers
English male singer-songwriters
Living people
Male new wave singers
People educated at Chesterfield Grammar School
People from Halifax, West Yorkshire
Musicians from West Yorkshire
Thompson Twins members
20th-century English bass guitarists
20th-century British male singers
21st-century English bass guitarists
English expatriates in New Zealand
English expatriates in the United States
British expatriates in New Zealand
British expatriates in the United States